Forté Project is an artist development scheme in Wales launched in 2015 by Beacons Cymru and Creative Wales.

Every year Forté Project supports several Welsh musicians at early stages in their career. The project is offered to those aged 16–25 for 6-months. Provided is support, opportunities and industry development. Artists have received radio airplay and performances across the world.

History 
The Forté Project started in 2015. In 2021 parent company Beacons Cymru was formed with support from Creative Wales.

Until 2021, the Forté Project was only for artists based in South Wales. However, for their 2021 cohort of artists the Forté Project became a Wales-wide scheme.

Forté Project's director is Spike Griffiths.

Editions

2023
In January 2023, Forté Project announced 10 more artist for their eighth cohort of the scheme.

2022
In January 2022, Forté Project announced their seventh cohort of the scheme, Forté 7. 
The 10 successful artists include:

Beacons Cymru 
Forté Project is one of the many projects created by parent company, Beacons Cymru during its formation in 2021. Several other projects include the Honey Sessions, Crwth and Summit.

References

External links 
Official website

Welsh music
Music in Cardiff
Recurring events established in 2015
Welsh music awards
2011 establishments in Wales